The "Knowledge Quarter" in Liverpool, England is a modern term in business given to the vicinity of Liverpool city centre that focuses heavily on the education, knowledge and research sectors.

Background
Although an unofficial ensemble, the Knowledge Quarter is recognised by the University of Liverpool, Liverpool John Moores University, Liverpool City Council, the Northwest Regional Development Agency and Liverpool Vision
— all of which realise the importance of the area and its major role in the national and international knowledge sector. Various institutions have been sited within the current borders of the knowledge quarter for centuries, and many institutions are currently undergoing multimillion-pound redevelopment schemes to cement the knowledge quarter as the United Kingdom's most successful such location. The knowledge quarter generates around 15% of the entire city's GVA and is educating upwards of 60,000 individuals in all manner of disciplines.

A special purpose vehicle, known as the Knowledge Quarter Development Company (KQDC) was set up in March 2018 to attract investment and oversee the expansion and development of the Knowledge Quarter's science and technology facilities. The KQDC is made up of partners from Liverpool City Council, the University of Liverpool and Liverpool John Moores University and hopes to attract investment up to £100 million.

The council announced in July 2018 that it had signed up three companies to oversee the creation of a Spatial Regeneration Framework for the Knowledge Quarter Gateway. GVA HOW Planning, K2 Architects and Planit-IE were tasked to look at how to best redevelop the areas around Lime Street Station & Central Station alongside plans by Liverpool John Moores University for new development of its Copperas Hill site. The report is hoped to be submitted in spring 2019.

Location

Geographically, the Knowledge Quarter stretches from Upper Parliament Street in the south to Islington in the north and is bound by Grove Street and Low Hill to the east and Renshaw Street to the west. The knowledge quarter generates £1 billion in income per year and supports some 14,000 full-time jobs. It is one of the greatest contributors to the economy of Liverpool. Liverpool Cathedral, Liverpool Metropolitan Cathedral, Philharmonic Hall and the World Museum are also located within the knowledge quarter. Since the early 2000s (decade), hundreds of millions have been invested in expanding and improving the knowledge quarter, the single largest redevelopment scheme is the £451 million new Royal Liverpool University Hospital.

Notable institutions

City of Liverpool College
City of Liverpool College is the only college of further education in the city, located on Myrtle Street was formed in 1991 by an amalgamation of four former colleges. Since 1999 over £47 million has been invested in City of Liverpool College, which in 2005 was awarded Beacon College Status in recognition of its outstanding performance. Approximately 17,000 students are enrolled at the institution.

Liverpool Institute for Performing Arts (LIPA)
The Liverpool Institute for Performing Arts is a performing arts higher education institution that was established in 1996 by Paul McCartney and Mark Featherstone-Witty.  The university offers foundation certificate courses, undergraduate courses and performing arts classes for 4- to 19-year-olds. The main LIPA building is housed in the former Liverpool Institute High School for Boys.

Liverpool John Moores University (LJMU)
Liverpool John Moores University is the largest educational institute in the city by student population (with around 26,000 enrolled). LJMU was founded in 1825 as Liverpool Mechanics' School of Arts, over the next century it merged with various other colleges to become Liverpool Polytechnic and in 1992 was granted university status as one of the United Kingdom's many 'new universities'. LJMU is arranged into six Faculties including Business and Law; Education, Community and Leisure; Health and Applied Social Sciences; Media, Arts and Social Science; Science and Technology and Environment. The majority of these faculties are located at the Byrom Street and Mount Pleasant campuses – both of which are situated within the "Liverpool knowledge quarter". Mass regeneration of LJMU has occurred since the start of the 21st century, amongst some of the university's newest properties are the £25 million Tom Reilly Building, the £27 million Art and Design Academy and the £37.6 million Clarence Street Building. In total, the university has invested some £180 million in a 10-year campus development programme (2003 to 2013).

Liverpool School of Tropical Medicine (LSTM)
The Liverpool School of Tropical Medicine was founded in 1898 as the first such school of its kind in the world. The school has made many contributions to tropical medicine, most notably the identification of the vector for malaria by Ronald Ross (who eventually went on the win a Nobel Prize for his discovery). LSTM is now a registered charity affiliated to the University of Liverpool and offers numerous postgraduate courses and diplomas. In 2005 Bill Gates donated £28 million to LSTM which allowed for a new £23 million state-of-the-art facility to be built adjoined to the original school.

Liverpool Science Park

Liverpool Science Park was established in 2006 with the completion of the  Innovation Centre 1 (ic1). Within its first year of existence, ic1 attracted over 50 new companies to the city, which further enhanced Liverpool's position as a leading centre of knowledge and enterprise. Nanotechnologies, healthcare, information technology, biotechnology, research and development into the automotive industry and specialist support services all have a strong presence at Liverpool Science Park which can be found between Mount Pleasant and Brownlow Hill. Since IC1 opened, a second building, IC2, has been added and in 2014 a large extension to IC1 opened containing 40,000 sq ft of commercial laboratory and office space. In total, the science park now provides 120,000 sq ft of high-specification grade A accommodation and laboratory space.

Liverpool Women's Hospital
The £30 million NHS foundation trust Liverpool Women's Hospital was built in 1995 after the formation of The Liverpool Maternity Hospital, The Women's Hospital and Mill Road Hospital in 1985. Liverpool Women's is one of only two such hospitals in the United Kingdom, as well as being the largest hospital in Europe devoted entirely to women's health. Maternity services, gynaecology, gynaecologic oncology, neonatology, reproductive medicine and genetics services are all available at the hospital which is located in the very south-eastern corner of the Knowledge Quarter.

National Oceanography Centre
The National Oceanography Centre (formerly and still occasionally known as the Proudman Oceanographic Laboratory) is located on Brownlow Street to the immediate north of Liverpool Metropolitan Cathedral. The centre is a fully owned research laboratory of the Natural Environment Research Council, world class research takes places at the NOC in the form of studying oceanography covering global sea levels and geodesy, numerical modelling of continental shelf seas and coastal sediment processes. The NOC began life as the Liverpool Observatory in 1845 and since then has continued to predict tidal activity and monitor overall sea conditions.

Royal College of Physicians
Founded in 1518, the Royal College of Physicians (RCP) is a British professional body dedicated to improving the practice of medicine, chiefly through the accreditation of physicians by examination. In 2016 it was announced that Liverpool had beaten competition from Manchester and Leeds to become the home of the RCP's Northern Headquarters. The new facility will be housed in a building named 'The Spine' which will be situated on the former site of Archbishop Blanch secondary school. The £35 million, 15-storey building will open in 2020 with the RCP using the bottom three and top four floors. The remaining seven floors are to be used by businesses in the education and science sectors.

Royal Liverpool University Hospital
The Royal Liverpool University Hospital is the largest general hospital in the city with over 50 wards and 850 beds, the accident and emergency department itself is the largest of its kind in the United Kingdom. The RLUH building which is sited on Prescot Street was built between 1966 and 1978 and is currently affiliated with both the University of Liverpool and Liverpool John Moores University. In March 2010, plans to demolish the RLUH in 2012 were approved by the British Government, approximately £328m was to be spent constructing a new state-of-the-art hospital on the same site, with in excess of £100 million being spent on new equipment for the hospital. The 646 bed hospital was due to open in 2017 but the completion date slipped to 2018. In February 2018, the collapse of the construction company Carillion brought work on the hospital to a halt. Construction is not expected to be completed before the end of the year.

Liverpool Medical Institution 
The Liverpool Medical Institution is one of the oldest institutions in the area, tracing its history back to 1779 when a group of local doctors created the Liverpool Medical Library. Today the institution "exists to foster an environment for furthering medical and health education and knowledge".

Sensor City 

Sensor City, which opened in July 2017 is one of four pilot University Enterprise Zone projects
established as a joint venture between Liverpool John Moores University and the University of Liverpool. to offer office space and on-site engineering support to small and start-up businesses.

The purpose-built building is clad in an artwork costing £500,000 in the form of 299 glass panels impregnated with a gold design in the theme of a printed circuit board.

University of Liverpool
The University of Liverpool was founded in 1881 as University College Liverpool and was granted university status in 1884 as part of the Victoria University. 1903 saw the institution become independent as the University of Liverpool. UoL is one of the original six 'red brick universities' and a member of the prestigious N8 and Russell Groups. Close to 20,000 students are enrolled at the University of Liverpool which offers more than 400 programmes covering 54 subject areas. Like Liverpool John Moores University, the UoL is also undergoing mass redevelopment – around £660 million is currently being invested in new buildings and facilities for the university.

Paddington Village
Paddington Village is a site at the eastern gateway to the city centre and has been earmarked as 1.8m sq ft of science, technology, education and health space.

In November 2016 a draft masterplan was published, outlining the plans for the site, which will be developed in three phases: Paddington Central, Paddington South and Paddington North.

The sites first two anchor tenants were announced as being a new Northern Centre of Excellence for the Royal College of Physicians and a new 45,000 sq ft education and learning facilities and 262 residential bed spaces for Liverpool International College.

Liverpool Mayor Joe Anderson announced that the council were looking into a new Merseyrail station to serve the site. A mention of a station is made in the October 2017 Liverpool City Region Combined Authority update to the Long Term Rail Strategy. Merseytravel commissioned a feasibility report into re-opening the Wapping Tunnel in May 2016 which found that it was a valid proposal which would allow for a new station to be built that could serve the Knowledge Quarter.

Initially, the plans included a 25-storey tower but after a public consultation in 2016 the plans were revised. Instead two gateway towers of no more than 15 storeys are planned. Liverpool International College hope to start work on a 13-storey tower block in May 2017. The block, which is hoped will be opened in January 2019, will have accommodation for 259 students as well as classrooms and a social hub.

It was announced in March 2017 that a proton beam therapy cancer treatment centre would be built next to the new Royal College of Physicians site. The £35 million Rutherford Cancer Centre is intended to be operational in 2018, offering radiotherapy, chemotherapy and imaging services. Proton beam therapy will become available at the centre in 2019.

The planned construction of a new 250-bed hotel & serviced apartment facility was announced at the 2018 MIPIM global property expo in Cannes. In November 2018, it was announced that Accor Hotels would be operating the hotel as part of their Novotel brand. The new hotel will be a four-star 160 bedroom facility with a 60 bedroom aparthotel and should be open in 2021.

At the 2018 Mipim UK property convention in London in October it was announced that Proton Partners, the parent company of Rutherford Cancer Centre, had started work on a headquarters for their Rutherford Diagnostics company. The building will also serve as a research centre and is sited next to their cancer treatment centre.

References

Education in Liverpool
Redevelopment projects in Liverpool
Academic enclaves
Economy of Liverpool